Kshetrimayum Indira Devi, known as Chirom Indira, is an Indian entrepreneur, designer, and social worker.

Life 
Devi was born in the Imphal West district of Manipur. She was the first born of six children. She is a graduate in Political Science but she also studied weaving at the Indian Institute of Hardware Technology in Guwahati and her first job was nearby at  GOENKA woollen mills ltd in 1994.

In 2003 she and her husband set up an export company for handloom created products.

In 2015 the Ministry of Textiles recognised her work and she became the first Indian recipient of the National Award in Design Development of Handloom Products.

On International Women's Day Devi was awarded the Nari Shakti Puraskar for her work with handloom weaving. The award was made by the President of India Ram Nath Kovind at the Presidential Palace (Rastrapati Bhavan) in New Delhi with the Prime Minister of India, Narendra Modi and the Minister for Women & Child Development, Maneka Sanjay Gandhi also attending. About 30 people and nine organisations were honoured that year, receiving the award and a prize each of $R 100,000. Another person honoured that day was Madhu Jain who was also excelling in textiles. On the same day as that award the nominations were open for fifteen women to receive the Women Transforming India Award which she was nominated for and awarded later that year.

By 2018 she had become a member of the "All India Handloom Board" which had been formed in 1992. Although the board was dissolved in 2020 as it was judged to be not effective enough.

References 

Indian designers
Living people
Year of birth missing (living people)
People from Manipur
Nari Shakti Puraskar winners